Paul Coleman may refer to:

 Paul Coleman (basketball) (1915–1995), American basketball player
 Paul Coleman (Gaelic football) (born 1968), Irish retired Gaelic footballer
 Paul Coleman (sailor), American competitive sailor
 Paul J. Coleman (1932–2019), American space scientist

See also 
 Paul Colman (born 1967), British–Australian musician